The following are events in 1875 which are relevant to the development of association football. Included are events in closely related codes, such as the Sheffield Rules.

Events
 6 March – England and Scotland meet at the Kennington Oval. The result is a 2–2 draw.
 13 March – The 1875 FA Cup Final is contested by Royal Engineers and Old Etonians at the Kennington Oval before a crowd of 2,000. The result is a 1–1 draw, necessitating the first-ever cup final replay.
 16 March – Royal Engineers defeat Old Etonians 2–0 in the FA Cup Final replay, again played at the Kennington Oval, with an increased attendance of 3,000.
 10 April – Queen's Park retain the Scottish Cup by defeating Renton 3–0 in the final at Hampden Park before an attendance of 7,000.

Clubs founded

England
 Birmingham City (then known as Small Heath Alliance)
 Blackburn Rovers

Scotland
 Hibernian

Domestic cups

Births
 23 May – Frank Forman (d. 1961), England international half-back in nine matches (1898–1903).
 23 August – Howard Spencer (d. 1940), England international full-back in six matches (1897–1905).
 24 July – George Molyneux (d. 1942), England international full-back in four matches (1902–1903).
 5 September – Jimmy Settle (d. 1954), England international forward in six matches (1899–1903), scoring six goals.
 6 September – Albert Wilkes (d. 1936), England international half-back in five matches (1901–1902).

References

 
Association football by year